Savignone is a comune (municipality) in the Metropolitan City of Genoa in the Italian region Liguria, located about  north of Genoa.

Savignone borders the following municipalities: Busalla, Casella, Crocefieschi, Mignanego, Serra Riccò, Valbrevenna.

History
The area of Savignone was settled probably in the Iron Age. In the Middle Ages it was a fief of Tortona, and in 1242 it was acquired by the Republic of Genoa which entrusted it to the Spinola family. Later it was under the Fieschi, who sold it back to Genoa in 1636. From 1815 it was part of the Kingdom of Sardinia, belonging to Italy from 1861.

Main sights
Fieschi castle (13th century)
Palazzo Fieschi (16th century)
Parish church of St. Bartholomew, housing two canvasses by Luca Cambiaso.

Demographic evolution

References

See also
 Parco naturale regionale dell'Antola

Cities and towns in Liguria